The Aravis Formation is a geologic formation in France. It preserves fossils dating back to the Cretaceous period.

See also 
 List of fossiliferous stratigraphic units in France

References 

Geologic formations of France
Lower Cretaceous Series of Europe
Aptian Stage